Sebastián "Berta" Muñiz (July 21, 1978 – in Buenos Aires) is an Argentine film actor and film producer best known for his work in the horror film genre.

He entered film in 1991 in New York Cop and has appeared in nearly 30 films since. He is particularly notable for his role in the Plaga Zombie horror film trilogy - Plaga Zombie (1997), Plaga Zombie: Zona Mutante (2001), and Plaga Zombie: Revolución Tóxica (2012) - which he also produced.

Filmography
Promedio Rojo 2 "Mis peores Amigos" (2013)... Papitas, Massera
Griscelda (2006) .... Asistente
Tengo el poder (2005) .... Carlos
Filmatron (2005) .... Gordo Hector
Hada buena – Una fábula peronista, El (2005) .... Examinador
Película de Francisco, La (2005) .... Die
¡Yok! (2005) .... L.A.
Promedio rojo (2004) (as Sebastián 'Berta' Muñiz) .... Papitas, Massera
Noin (2003) .... Noin
Amigos del demonio (2002)
Plaga zombie: Zona mutante (2001) (V) .... John West
Vacaciones en la Tierra (2001) (V) .... Max
Bar imperial (2001) .... Pibe
Nunca asistas a este tipo de fiestas (2000) (V) .... Coronel Santoro
Nathán: El peluche asesino (2000) .... Él mismo (episodio 'Programación maldita')
Rockabilly (2000) (V) .... Hombre de la barra de hielo
Cucaracha (1999)
Cortos de las chicas de enfrente (1998)
Demonios municipales (1998)
No pizza (1998)
Plaga zombie (1997) (V) .... John West
Cama, La (1996)
Hotel paraíso (1996)
Ataque del vampiro espacial, El (1995)
Bajo el poder de la garra maldita (1995)
Hombre rata, El (1994)
Mutantes compactos (1994)
Farsatoons (1993)
Trilogía de hijo de puta (1993)
New York Cop (1992)
plaga zombie: zona mutante: revolucion toxica (2011)

External links
 

1978 births
Living people
Male actors from Buenos Aires
Argentine male film actors
20th-century Argentine male actors
Argentine film producers
21st-century Argentine male actors